Manakkad is a village in Thodupuzha Taluk of Idukki District in Kerala, India, bordering Thodupuzha town on the banks of the Thodupuzha river.

Overview 

Its name is sometimes confused with those of Manarkad in Kottayam District and Manacaud (with the same Malayalam pronunciation as Manakkad) which is a locality in Thiruvananthapuram City.  Manakkad Village also has a Panchayat known as Manakkad Panchayat.

Arikuzha is the first ward of this Panchayat and it lies in the border of Idukki and Ernakulam districts.
The telephone exchange is situated in Arikuzha. Arikuzha is a natural village with lot of scenic beauties. The 
village consists mainly of farmers and a few planters. Majority are Hindu and Christian population with a few Muslim families.
Cultivation consists of rubber plantation, rice and coconut. A rare mix of central travancore culture. The village has a good literacy rate and are continually improving the human potential in the fields of IT, nursing service and other emerging sectors

Churches
There is the Saint Sebastian's church at memadangu and the small church at the arikuzha village center. There are also Pentecostal churches near such as IPC, Assemblies of God in India etc.

Schools
The town centre is hosting the government lower and the upper primary school. The High is situated in conjunction with the Saint Sebastians Church. Both these schools has big playgrounds which would be busy with plenty of games and funs towards the evening. It is the second home for all the new buds of the village.

Temples
There is a number of temples can be seen around this place:

Sree Narasimha Swamy Temple
Varikkathanathu Bhagavathi Temple
Moozhikal kavu Bhagavathi Temple
Tottakara Sri Mahadeva Temple
Alppara Sri Mahadeva Temple

Government Offices
The District Agricultural Farm is situated here and the office is inside the farm.

Demographics
 India census, Manakkad had a population of 14651 with 7338 males and 7313 females.

References

Villages in Idukki district